Bernard Vaillant (26 March 1948 – 22 March 2019) was a Belgian volleyball player. He competed in the men's tournament at the 1968 Summer Olympics.

References

External links
 

1948 births
2019 deaths
Belgian men's volleyball players
Olympic volleyball players of Belgium
Volleyball players at the 1968 Summer Olympics
People from Arlon
Sportspeople from Luxembourg (Belgium)